David M. Brewer (April 22, 1959 – April 29, 2003) was the seventh person executed by the state of Ohio since it reinstated the death penalty in 1981. Brewer died by lethal injection on April 29, 2003, after spending 17 years and six months on death row. He was convicted of the 1985 murder of 21-year-old Sherry Byrne, the wife of a college fraternity brother.

After his indictment by a grand jury, Brewer waived his right to a jury and elected to be tried by a three-judge panel. He was found guilty on September 19, 1985, and sentenced to death in October 1985. His subsequent appeals at the state and federal levels were unsuccessful, as was his request for executive clemency.

At 10:00 a.m. on April 29, 2003, Brewer was led into the execution chamber at the state prison in Lucasville, Ohio. He was declared dead at 10:20 a.m.

See also 
 Capital punishment in Ohio
 Capital punishment in the United States
 List of people executed in Ohio
 List of people executed in the United States in 2003

General references 
 Clark Prosecutor
 "Ohio's Seventh Execution Since 1999; Killer Offers No Final Apology" Columbus Dispatch (Ohio). April 30, 2003
 State v. Brewer, 1996 Ohio App. LEXIS 2517
 State v. Brewer, 1988 Ohio App. LEXIS 3492
 2005 Capital Crimes Report (PDF) Office of the Ohio Attorney General.

External links 
 Details of Sherry Byrne's killing (The Enquirer 2003)

1959 births
2003 deaths
1985 murders in the United States
21st-century executions by Ohio
American people executed for murder
21st-century executions of American people
People executed by Ohio by lethal injection
People convicted of murder by Ohio
People from Middletown, Ohio
American rapists
Executed people from Ohio